Heriberto "Eddie" Rivera (born 7 July 1970) is a Puerto Rican basketball player. He competed in the men's tournament at the 1996 Summer Olympics.

References

1970 births
Living people
Puerto Rican men's basketball players
Olympic basketball players of Puerto Rico
Basketball players at the 1996 Summer Olympics
Rochester Renegade players
Basketball players from New York City
UTEP Miners men's basketball players